Bob Starr, Bobby Starr or Robert Star may refer to:

 Bob Starr (sportscaster) (1933–1998), former American sportscaster
 Bob Starr (wrestler) (born 1971), semi-retired American professional wrestler
 Bobby Starr, singer
 Robert A. Starr, politician
 Robert H. Starr, aircraft designer